Daniel Beltrá (born 1964) is a Spanish photographer and artist who makes work about human impact on the environment.

The focus of Beltrá's recent work has been fine art aerial photography of landscapes and environmental issues. His best known project is a series of photographs of the Deepwater Horizon oil spill, titled Spill, which have been exhibited in galleries and museums across Europe and North America. Other topics he has photographed are tropical deforestation in Brazil, Indonesia, and the Democratic Republic of the Congo and global warming in the Arctic, Patagonia and the Southern Ocean. In September 2012, he documented the record-lowest summer sea ice level in the Arctic, which were later included in his "Ice" exhibition.

Life and work
Beltrá started his career with photos of bombings by the Basque separatist organization Euskadi Ta Askatasuna (ETA) while he was a student at the Complutense University of Madrid. He went on to work at EFE and the Gamma photo agency while also photographing assignments for Greenpeace. He is a board member of the International League of Conservation Photographers. He moved to Seattle in 2001.

Beltrá has presented his work in slideshows and lectures at galleries and conferences across North America, including the 9th World Wilderness Congress, the Annenberg Space for Photography, the Aquarium of the Pacific, and the ABC Continuity Forum.

Beltrá was granted a commission by Charles, Prince of Wales for the Prince's Rainforests Project (PRP) to document the status of the world's great tropical rainforests in 2009.

Publications
Spill. London: Gost, 2013. . With an essay by Barbara Bloemink. Edition of 2500 copies.

Exhibitions
Benham Gallery, Seattle. Sustainability / Sostenibilidad, May 2009 – July 2009.
City Hall, Paris. Prince's Rainforests Exhibition, October 2009.
Kew Botanical Gardens, London. Prince's Rainforests exhibition, October–December 2009.
212 Gallery, Aspen. Spill, August–December 2010.
Seattle Aquarium, Seattle. Spill, May–August 2011.
Aquarium of the Pacific, Long Beach, Calif. Spill, October 2011 – January 2012.
Roca Gallery, Barcelona. Marea Negra, October 2011 – January 2012.
Catherine Edleman Gallery, Chicago. Spill, March–June 2012.
"Power", Prix Pictet touring exhibition, toured the world, including London, Paris, and Istanbul.
Somerset House, London. Landmark, Fields of Photography March–April 2013.
Quintenz Gallery, Aspen. Ice, December 2012 – February 2013.
Aperture Gallery, New York. Power, November 2013 – February 2014.
Museum of Photographic Arts, San Diego. Power, February–April 2014.
Lentos Kunstmuseum, Linz, Austria. Pure Water, October 2014 – February 2015.

Awards
2006: 3rd prize, World Press Photo awards, nature series category, for his work on the Amazon Rainforest drought
2006: Golden Award, China Press International Photo (CHIPP) Contest, for his work on the Amazon Rainforest drought
2007: 2nd prize, World Press Photo awards, contemporary issues category, for a photo of tropical deforestation in the Amazon
2009: Global Vision Award, Pictures of the Year International
2011: Winner, Veolia Environment Wildlife Photographer of the Year and the "Deeper Perspective of the Year" from the International Photography Awards for his photographs from the Gulf Oil spill
2012: Shortlisted, 2012 Prix Pictet 
2013: Knowledge Dissemination and Communication in Biodiversity Conservation award, BBVA Foundation, Spain
2014: First place, Nature and Environment category, China Press International Photo contest
2018: Nominated, World Press Photo of the Year, World Press Photo, Amsterdam

References

External links

Spanish photographers
American photographers
Place of birth missing (living people)
Living people
1964 births